is a Japanese football player for FC Gifu.

National team career
In October 2013, Nagashima was elected Japan U-17 national team for 2013 U-17 World Cup. He played in three matches.

Club statistics
Updated to 23 February 2018.

References

External links
Profile at FC Gifu
 

1996 births
Living people
Association football people from Kyoto Prefecture
Japanese footballers
J2 League players
J3 League players
Kyoto Sanga FC players
FC Gifu players
Association football midfielders